The 1995 Paris–Tours was the 89th edition of the Paris–Tours cycle race and was held on 15 October 1995. The race started in Saint-Arnoult-en-Yvelines and finished in Tours. The race was won by Nicola Minali of the Gewiss–Ballan team.

General classification

References

1995 in French sport
1995
Paris-Tours
1995 in road cycling
October 1995 sports events in Europe